Pole Atanraoi-Reim, Kiribati’s first female lawyer, was born to Atanraoi and Clare Baiteke. Her father Atanraoi, a retired diplomat, ecologist, and historian, served as Kiribati's first Secretary of Foreign Affairs 

Atanraoi-Reim received her higher education from Kiribati, New Zealand, and Papua New Guinea. In 1992, she became the first woman called to the Kiribati bar. She was also registered as a practicing lawyer in the Federated States of Micronesia. Her legal career included serving as the Assistant Attorney General and Chief of Litigation in the government of Micronesia, legal trainer for Fiji’s Human Rights at the Regional Rights Resources Team / UNDP, and the Director of Public Prosecutions and Senior State Advocate in Kiribati. While working at the latter position, Atanraoi contributed to the book Customary land tenure and sustainable development: complementarity or conflict? (1995). 

Prior to becoming a legal advisor for the Pacific Islands Forum Fisheries Agency (FFA) in 2015, Atanraoi-Reim served as a Legal Rights Resource Trainer for the Pacific Regional Rights Resource Team (RRRT) and an acting Attorney-General. She died on August 18, 2018 after battling cancer.

See also 
 List of first women lawyers and judges in Oceania

References 

2018 deaths
Year of birth missing
20th-century I-Kiribati lawyers
21st-century I-Kiribati lawyers
20th-century I-Kiribati women lawyers
21st-century I-Kiribati women lawyers